No Soap, Radio is an American sitcom and sketch comedy that aired on ABC on Thursdays from April 15 until May 13, 1982. Five episodes were broadcast. The five episodes also appeared on the BBC, where the deletion of commercial breaks gave the show an even more rapid-fire look.

The title is taken from a 1950s prank where "no soap radio" is given as a non-sequitur punchline to a joke.

Plot
Overall, the plots of No Soap, Radio were very loosely wound and often nonsensical, as with one episode's subplot involving a sentient, man-eating chair.  Continuity and plausibility were usually cheerfully ignored, and what continuing story there was in any given episode often centered around the staff at Atlantic City, New Jersey's Pelican Hotel, a former "showplace" that was now somewhat faded.  Seen most frequently were Roger, the young, optimistic but sometimes overwhelmed owner/manager; Karen, his sunny, capable assistant (replacing Sharon, who only appeared in the pilot); and Tuttle, the villainous house detective who was desperate to have Roger sell the hotel.  There were also several residents of the hotel who were featured, including the ebullient Mr. Plitzky, the determinedly perky Marion, and chronic complainer Mrs. Belmont.

Somewhat inspired by Monty Python's Flying Circus, each episode of No Soap, Radio was filled with sight gags, blackouts, and non-sequiturs.  The show would frequently cut away to "Special Reports" right in the middle of a scene, with a fictitious news anchor detailing an improbable story.  At other times, characters would watch a television commercial that would suddenly become the focus of a scene.  Still other times, doors within the hotel might be opened to reveal any sort of environment from a business to a national park, and entire scenes would play out in these "hotel rooms" with no seeming connection to the main plot.

Cast
 Steve Guttenberg as Roger
 Hillary B. Smith as Karen
 Stuart Pankin as Tuttle
 Bill Dana as Mr. Plitzky
 Fran Ryan as Mrs. Belmont
 Edie McClurg as Marion
 Jerry Maren as Morris

Episodes

References

External links
 

Television shows set in New Jersey
American Broadcasting Company original programming
1982 American television series debuts
1982 American television series endings
1980s American sketch comedy television series
1980s American sitcoms
English-language television shows
Television series created by Michael Jacobs
Television series by Fremantle (company)